Stefan G. Bucher (born 1973) is an American writer, graphic designer and illustrator. He works through his design studio, 344 Design.

Biography 
Stefan G. Bucher was born in Germany in 1973. Bucher moved to California to attend the Art Center College of Design and was naturalized as a US citizen in 2009.

Upon graduation, Bucher became art director at the advertising agency Wieden & Kennedy in Portland, Oregon. Bucher went on to design numerous CD packages including Brand New Day: The Remixes for Sting, and the soundtrack for The Matrix. His design of the 17th "American Photography" annual received the 2001 Silver Award for "Outstanding complete book design" by British Design & Advertising. His clients included KCRW DJ Jason Bentley, art gallery L.A. Louver, and painter David Hockney makes more frequent use of illustration and hand-lettering. He created the main title typography and title design for the films The Fall, Immortals, and Mirror Mirror, all directed by Tarsem Singh.

He is the author of the book All Access – The Making of Thirty Extraordinary Graphic Designers. In her review of the book for Communication Arts magazine, editor Anne Telford said:

In 2004 the Art Directors Club of New York named Bucher one of their "Young Guns", honoring him as one of the leading creatives age 30 and under. He has been an active member of AIGA, having served as the vice-president of membership of the Los Angeles Chapter from 1999 to 2001 and as vice-president of event programming from 2001 to 2003. He is a frequent speaker on graphic design at schools and design organizations across the United States. His column ink & circumstance appeared in the pages of the now defunct "STEP inside design" magazine. His book The Graphic Eye – Photographs By Graphic Designers From Around The Globe was released in Europe by RotoVision S.A. and in the United States by Chronicle Books in October 2009.

In 2011 the online software training web site lynda.com produced an hour-long documentary on Bucher and his work as part of their creative inspirations series, entitled "Stefan G. Bucher, designer, Illustrator, and Writer". In the same year, Bucher designed a yeti character for Saks Fifth Avenue that was produced as a plush animal. In 2012 he wrote and illustrated the character's origin story for the book "The Yeti Story" published by HarperCollins. Saks adapted the plot and artwork of this book into their holiday store windows in 2013.

Bucher was the programing chair of the 2015 AIGA Design Conference in New Orleans, Louisiana.

Daily Monster 
He is the creator of the online animation series Daily Monster. For 100 days he filmed himself drawing a new monster every night, based on random ink blots. Visitors then posted stories about each monster on the blog. The clips have been downloaded over a million times and are collected, along with selected stories, in the book 100 Days of Monsters with a foreword by Ze Frank. The series has been included in the prestigious Communication Arts Illustration and American Illustration annuals, and was the subject of the annual Fresh Dialogue event held by the New York chapter of the American Institute of Graphic Arts (AIGA) in May 2007. Variations of the Daily Monster clips appear on the relaunched TV show The Electric Company.

Bibliography
 All Access – The Making of Thirty Extraordinary Graphic Designers. .
 100 Days of Monsters. .
 The Graphic Eye – Photographs By Graphic Designers From Around The Globe. .
 You Deserve A Medal – Honors on the Path To True Love. .
 344 Questions: The Creative Person's Do-It-Yourself Guide to Insight, Survival, and Artistic Fulfillment. .
 The Yeti Story. 
 Stefan G. Bucher's LetterHeads: An Eccentric Alphabet.

References

External links
 The Daily Monster
 344 Loves You
 Work Inspiration with Stefan G. Bucher - Interview on Workspiration.org
 Video interview with Bucher on Russell Davies' "Thoughts of a Planner" website
 Podcast Interview with Bucher on Von Glitschka's "Illustrative Designer" podcast

1973 births
Living people
American graphic designers
American typographers and type designers
German emigrants to the United States
American poster artists
Video bloggers
Wieden+Kennedy people